Earl Elburn "Cowboy" Bartlett (December 16, 1908 – January 1987) was a professional American football halfback in the National Football League. He was born in Purcell, Oklahoma. He played college football at Centre College.

References

1908 births
1987 deaths
People from Purcell, Oklahoma
Players of American football from Oklahoma
American football running backs
Pittsburgh Steelers players
Boston Shamrocks (AFL) players
Centre Colonels football players